William Charles Anton (c. 1901 – 1967) was an association football player who represented New Zealand at international level.

Anton made a single appearance in an official international for the All Whites in a 1–1 draw with Australia on 24 June 1922.

References

External links
 

1900s births
1967 deaths
New Zealand association footballers
New Zealand international footballers
Waterside Karori players
Association football forwards